Western State School and Hospital, later known as Western Center, was a state-run mental hospital and reform school near Canonsburg, Pennsylvania.  It is best known as an institution serving people with intellectual disabilities.  At various times during its existence, it was also known as the Pennsylvania Reform School, Youth Development Center of Canonsburg and The House of Refuge.  Locally, it was called Morganza.  It was a well-known part of the Canonsburg community, appearing as a stop on tours during community festivals.

The exterior of Western Center's administration building was used as the setting for Baltimore State Hospital for the Criminally Insane, where Hannibal Lecter was incarcerated, in the 1991 film The Silence of the Lambs.

History and closure
The Pennsylvania Reform School, originally the House of Refuge of Western Pennsylvania, opened in 1850 as a reform school for local delinquent children. Originally located on the north shore of the Ohio River, the school relocated in 1872 to Morganza, an area northeast of Canonsburg, Pa., in Washington County. The school changed its name in 1876 to the Pennsylvania Reform School. The school was the home of youth under the age of 21, many of whom were convicted of crimes such as theft, larceny, rape, and murder. The school often applied strict discipline policies to force adherence to their rules, and students were often contracted for labor in nearby farms. In 1911, the school, attempting to remove the stigma of a reform school, changed its name to the Pennsylvania Industrial Training School. The school changed its name a fourth time in 1960, to the Canonsburg Youth Development Center. In 1962, a hospital for mentally disabled people also opened on the campus. The Youth Development Center was eventually phased out of existence, and the mental hospital, eventually named Western Center, utilized some the former reformatory buildings.

In 1986, the Washington County Redevelopment Authority acquired land around Western Center.  The areas was ideal because of its access to Interstate 79, its proximity to Pittsburgh, and low tax rates.

In 1992, Western Center was the subject of a lawsuit brought by disability advocates against the Pennsylvania Department of Public Welfare; the lawsuit resulted in a settlement that permitted the state to move residents to community-based facilities.

In 1993, the Washington County Redevelopment Authority began construction on its property near Western Center, building what would become Phase I of Southpointe.

The state decided to close the facility in 1998 and began making plans to move its remaining 380 residents to community-based facilities.  The final closure came in 2000, with the 56 remaining residents moved to temporary housing before final placement in community-based facilities throughout Western Pennsylvania.  The closing, the timing of which came as a surprise, was controversial, especially because the temporary locations were frequently to far-flung locations, including state's Ebensburg Center.  The employee's union, residents' families, and the original litigants in the 1992 lawsuit sued unsuccessfully to stop the move.  Many of the residents were moved to community-based facilities run by Allegheny Valley School.

The final building, the administration building, was demolished in late 2011.  The land around the former center was eventually absorbed into Southpointe, with the actual location of the facility being re-developed with brownfield status.

By 2013, Phase II of Southpointe was completed, with the phases totaling .  A third phase is planned for the other side of Interstate 79, to be called Cool Valley Industrial Park.

Reputation 
In 2011, David E. Stuart, a professor at University of New Mexico who had been an employee of Western State School and Hospital during the 1960s, wrote a book based on his experiences.  In the book, Stuart describes the history of abuse and neglect that the reform school at Morganza had become known for.  In fact, during the 1950s and 1960s, local parents seeking to discipline their children threatened to send them to "Morganza" if they did not behave.

In 2014, Christopher R Barraclough, wrote a book, Morganza: Pennsylvania's Reform School, about the history of the reform school.  Morganza: Pennsylvania's Reform School is part of the "Images of America" series books published by Arcadia Publishing.

References

External links 

 Photos from the abandoned site in 2005

Canonsburg, Pennsylvania
Psychiatric hospitals in Pennsylvania
Defunct hospitals in Pennsylvania